The county of East Sussex is divided into six districts. The districts of East Sussex are Hastings, Rother, Wealden, Eastbourne, Lewes, and Brighton & Hove.

As there are 348 Grade II* listed buildings in the county they have been split into separate lists for each district.

 Grade II* listed buildings in Hastings
 Grade II* listed buildings in Rother
 Grade II* listed buildings in Wealden
 Grade II* listed buildings in Eastbourne
 Grade II* listed buildings in Lewes (district)
 Grade II* listed buildings in Brighton and Hove

See also
 Grade I listed buildings in East Sussex

References

 
Lists of Grade II* listed buildings in East Sussex